Cyle is a male given name. Notable people with the name include:

Cyle Brink (born 1994), South African rugby union player
Cyle Larin (born 1995), Canadian soccer player

See also
Kyle (given name)

Masculine given names